!Arriba! La Pachanga is an album by Mongo Santamaría, published by Fantasy Records in 1959.

Musicians 
 Mongo Santamaría and his Band
 Mongo Santamaría – congas, bongos  
 Rolando Lozano – flute 
 José "Chombo" Silva – saxophone 
 Felix "Pupi" Legarreta – violin
 João Donato – piano
 Victor Venegas – bass guitar
 Willie Bobo – timbales, bongos
 Cuco Martinez – timbales, percussion
 Rudy Calzado – voice

Track listing

LP version

Footnotes

References

External links 
 
 
 
 

1961 albums
Latin jazz albums by Cuban artists